Lithocarpus echinulatus is a tree in the beech family Fagaceae. The specific epithet  is from the Latin meaning "having short spines", referring to the cupule.

Description
The brownish bark is smooth.

Distribution and habitat
Lithocarpus echinulatus is endemic to Borneo. Its habitat is dipterocarp forests, generally by rivers, up to  altitude.

References

echinulatus
Endemic flora of Borneo
Trees of Borneo
Plants described in 1970
Flora of the Borneo lowland rain forests